Sylvester Willy Sivertsen (born 8 May 1992), known professionally as Sly, is a Danish successful songwriter and music producer who has written and produced the following: Dua Lipa's "We're Good", Sigrid's album "Mirror", Jonas Brothers'  "Comeback" (from the album Happiness Begins), Shawn Mendes' "Higher", The Chainsmokers' "Side Effects", Liam Payne’s "Slow" and "Live Forever" (featuring Cheat Codes), among others.

Sly is the son of Danish singer and songwriter Lis Sørensen and drummer Jan Sivertsen.

Discography

Production and songwriting credits

Artist credits

2020 
 Sly - "Cotton Candy" (feat. Emily Warren)

Awards 

 Won BMI Award for Most-Performed Song of the Year 2020, for "Side Effects" by The Chainsmokers.
 Won BMI Award for Most-Performed Song of the Year 2022, for "We're Good" by Dua Lipa.
 Nominated for Carl-prisen 2020, Producer of the Year and International Success of the Year.
 Won Danish Music Award for Best Danish Producer 2021
 Nominated for Carl-prisen 2022, Pop composer of the Year and International Success of the Year.
 Won Carl Prisen 2022 for International Success of the year

References

External links 
 Facebook
 Instagram

1992 births
Living people